The kyrielle is a poetic form that originated in troubadour poetry.

Name and form 

The name kyrielle derives from the Kýrie, which is part of many Christian liturgies. A kyrielle is written in rhyming couplets or quatrains. It may use the phrase "Lord, have mercy", or a variant on it, as a refrain as the second line of the couplet or last line of the quatrain. In less strict usage, other phrases, and sometimes single words, are used as the refrain. Each line within the poem consists of only eight syllables. There is no limit to the number of stanzas a Kyrielle may have, but three is considered the accepted minimum. 

If the kyrielle is written in couplets, the rhyme scheme will be: a-A, a-A. There are a number of possible rhyme schemes for kyrielle constructed in quatrains, including a-a-b-B, c-c-b-B and a-b-a-B, c-b-c-B (uppercase letters signify the refrain). In the original French kyrielle, lines were generally octosyllabic. In English, the lines are generally iambic tetrameters.

An example 

This kyrielle is by Thomas Campion.

A Lenten Hymn 

With broken heart and contrite sigh, 
A trembling sinner, Lord, I cry: 
Thy pard’ning grace is rich and free: 
O God, be merciful to me. 

I smite upon my troubled breast, 
With deep and conscious guilt oppress, 
Christ and His cross my only plea: 
O God, be merciful to me. 

Far off I stand with tearful eyes, 
Nor dare uplift them to the skies; 
But Thou dost all my anguish see: 
O God, be merciful to me. 

Nor alms, nor deeds that I have done, 
Can for a single sin atone; 
To Calvary alone I flee: 
O God, be merciful to me.

And when, redeemed from sin and hell, 
With all the ransomed throng I dwell, 
My raptured song shall ever be, 
God has been merciful to me.

References

External links 
 More notes and examples
 "How to Write a Kyrielle" by Dusty Grein at the online journal of the Society of Classical Poets

Western medieval lyric forms